Ulva grandis is a species of seaweed in the family Ulvaceae that is endemic to Kiamari, Pakistan. The name comes from Latin meaning large.

References

Further reading

Ulvaceae
Plants described in 1977
Endemic flora of Pakistan